Dolphin Point is a locality and residential area on the southern fringe of the Milton-Ulladulla conurbation, New South Wales, Australia. It is located about 7 km south of Ulladalla town centre on the southern shore of the Burrill Lake inlet and bounded to the east by the Tasman Sea. It is part of the Shoalhaven local government area.

References

City of Shoalhaven
Towns in the South Coast (New South Wales)
Coastal towns in New South Wales